Often referred to as the Rogers Free Library Act, the Rogers Act of 1878 (officially, California State Senate Bill Number 1) was an 1877 bill written in the upper house of the California State Legislature and signed into law on March 18, 1878, by Governor of California William Irwin. It was entitled "An Act to establish and maintain free public libraries and reading rooms" and popularly named after its lead author, State Senator George H. Rogers.

Content
The general provisions were permissive rather than mandatory.

The law specifically appointed 11 founding members to the Library Board of Trustees for the City and County of San Francisco:

 George H. Rogers, state senator
 John S. Hager, former U.S. senator
 Irving M. Scott, Union Iron Works
 Robert J. Tobin, Hibernia Bank
 E. D. Sawyer
 John H. Wise
 Andrew J. Moulder, superintendent of schools
 Louis Sloss, Alaska Commercial Company
 A. S. Hallidie
 C. C. Terrell
 Henry George

History

While prior to 1878, the California cities of Los Angeles, Marysville, and San Jose had organized public libraries within their municipalities, the Act resulted from the effort to organize what would become the San Francisco Public Library. A meeting was held on August 3, 1877 at Dashaway Hall in San Francisco; as reported by the Daily Alta California, the meeting was convened by Senator Rogers, who had surveyed "all the principal libraries in the United States and Europe" with the intent to create a public library, which was deemed capable of "furnishing moral, religious and intellectual food for the masses." On August 5, the Daily Alta published an editorial describing their advice to an unidentified donor some years past, suggesting that he donate  annually to allow the Mercantile Library, one of the private libraries that then existed in the city, to lend its collection freely. The initial meeting on August 3 concluded by resolving to draft legislation to be sent to Senator Rogers for consideration at the state level.

Eureka was the first city to reform its library into a free library following the passage of the Rogers Act, the Oakland Free Library was the second, and at least ten others were established within the first 24 months, including Chico (April 1879) and Sacramento (June 14, 1879).

References

External links
  Direct URL.
  Direct URL (Microsoft Word).

1878 in American law
California statutes
Public libraries in California